The Langfast is a ridge in the district of Göttingen in North Germany.
South Harz mountains between Herzberg am Harz and Sieber.

Ridges of Lower Saxony
Hills of the Harz